La Malahá is a municipality located in the province of Granada, Spain. According to the 2005 census (INE), the city has a population of 1679 inhabitants. La Malaha is located at the foot of the mining hill of Montevives.

References

Municipalities in the Province of Granada